William Gilbert Demas, OCC, TC (14 November 1929 in Port of Spain – 28 November 1998) was a Trinidadian and Tobagonian politician and banker.

From 1973 to 1974, Demas was the first Secretary-General of the Caribbean Community (CARICOM). He had previously been the Secretary-General of its predecessor, the Caribbean Free Trade Agreement (CARIFTA) from 1969 to 1973 and was instrumental in reforming CARIFTA to CARICOM.

Demas was the Governor of the Central Bank of Trinidad and Tobago from 1988 to 1992. 

He was awarded the Trinity Cross, Trinidad and Tobago's highest award, in 1989. In 1992 he was one of the initial recipients of the Order of the Caribbean Community, the highest honour awarded by the Caribbean Community. He was also awarded the Cacique's Crown of Honour, Guyana's second-highest award, in 1972, the Companion of Honour of Barbados in 1982 and the Order of San Carlos by the government of Colombia.

References 

Caribbean Community
Trinidad and Tobago politicians
Governors of the Central Bank of Trinidad and Tobago
Recipients of the Trinity Cross
Recipients of the Order of the Caribbean Community